Michail Elgin and Nikolaus Moser were the defending champions but Moser decided not to participate.
Elgin partnered up with Alexandre Kudryavtsev, but they were eliminated by Radu Albot and Artem Smirnov in the quarterfinals.

Karan Rastogi and Vishnu Vardhan won the title. They defeated 4th seeds Harri Heliövaara and Denys Molchanov 7–6(7–3), 2–6, [10–8] in the final.

Seeds

Draw

Draw

References

 Main Draw

Astana Cup - Doubles
2011 Doubles